Dahana may refer to:

Places
 Iran
 Dahana, Iran, in Sistan and Baluchestan

 Tajikistan
 Dahana, Khatlon, a village and a jamoat in Khatlon Region
 Dahana, Asht District, a village in Sughd Region
 Dahana, Yaghnob, a village in Sughd Region

Other uses
 Dahana (moth), a genus of moth